The 2008 Zuiderduin Darts Masters was a darts competition held from December 12 to December 14, 2008, in Egmond aan Zee, Netherlands, run by the British Darts Organisation and the World Darts Federation.  Having been an unranked event in previous years, it was installed as a major tournament in the BDO/WDF darts calendar, following the disbanding of the International Darts League and the World Darts Trophy.  Also, for the first time, a women's competition was held.

In the men's event, number one seed Gary Anderson defended his title with a 5–4 win over number two seed, Scott Waites.  The women's event was won by Lisa Ashton, who replaced the initial top seed Anastasia Dobromyslova following her withdrawal, beating Trina Gulliver in the final.

Results

Men's tournament

Group stage
all matches best of 9 legs.
P = Played; W = Won; L = Lost; LF = Legs for; LA = Legs against; +/− = Leg difference; Pts = Points

Group A

Steve West 86.25 5–4 Ted Hankey 90.75
Gary Anderson 95.43 5–4 Ted Hankey 95.70
Gary Anderson 101.55 5–0 Steve West 76.26

Group B

Mareno Michels 90.60 5–1 Stuart Kellett 82.65
Darryl Fitton 95.46 5–2 Stuart Kellett 88.05
Darryl Fitton 88.14 5–3 Mareno Michels 88.13

Group C

Henny van der Ster 83.13 5–2 Martin Atkins 80.88
Mark Webster 95.76 5–4 Martin Atkins 90.15
Henny van der Ster 82.53 5–4 Mark Webster 81.66

Group D

Alan Norris 86.16 5–2 Geert De Vos 80.82
Martin Adams 97.71 5–1 Geert De Vos 78.24
Alan Norris 85.80 5–3 Martin Adams 76.26

Group E

Brian Woods 95.13 5–0 Willy van de Wiel 80.79
Gary Robson 89.88 5–1 Willy van de Wiel 83.85
Gary Robson 94.53 5–2 Brian Woods 86.94

Group F

Joey ten Berge 92.58 5–3 Andy Boulton 87.27
Tony O'Shea 94.32 5–3 Andy Boulton 90.81
Tony O'Shea 91.32 5–4 Joey ten Berge 88.80

Group G

Mark Barilli 89.82 5–4 Martin Phillips 83.67
Martin Phillips 98.31 5–1 Edwin Max 86.37
Edwin Max 83.79 5–3 Mark Barilli 84.36

Group H

Davy Richardson 90.45 5–2 Ross Montgomery 84.15
Ross Montgomery 86.67 5–4 Scott Waites 87.63
Scott Waites 88.41 5–0 Davy Richardson 75.72

Knockout stages

Women's tournament

References

Zuiderduin Masters
Zuiderduin Masters
Finder Darts Masters